Miroslav Vraštil (born 17 October 1982) is a Czech rower. He competed in the men's lightweight coxless four event at both the 2012 and 2016 Summer Olympics; he came eleventh in 2012 and twelfth in 2016. His father, Miroslav Vraštil Sr., represented Czechoslovakia at the Olympics in 1972, 1976, and 1980.

References

External links
 

1982 births
Living people
Czech male rowers
Olympic rowers of the Czech Republic
Rowers at the 2012 Summer Olympics
Rowers at the 2016 Summer Olympics
Rowers at the 2020 Summer Olympics
Sportspeople from Olomouc